Sibrevcom Street is a west-east street in Tsentralny City District of Novosibirsk, Russia. It runs from a T-intersection with Krasny Avenue, crosses Serebrennikovskaya Street and ends near the Sibrevcomovsky Bridge over Ippodromskaya Street.

History
The street was previously called the Voznesenskaya Street, but was renamed in 1924.

Architecture
 Vykhodsev House. The building was built in 1911.
 School No. 12 is a school on the corner of Sibrevcom and Serebrennikovskaya streets. It was built in 1912. Architect: A. D. Kryachkov.
 Nikitin House. The building was built in 1915.
 100-Flat Building is a building on the corner of Krasny Avenue and Sibrevcom Street. It was built in 1937. Architects: A. D. Krychkov, V. S. Maslennikov. At the Exposition Internationale des Arts et Techniques dans la Vie Moderne in Paris on December 11, 1937, the project was awarded the 1st degree diploma, a gold medal, and a Grand Prix.

Gallery

Organizations
 Sinar Garment Factory. The company was founded in 1921.
 Sibrechproject is a project organization founded in 1947.
 Siberian Memorial Art Gallery
 Bason Company is a design and sewing company of home textiles.

References

Tsentralny City District, Novosibirsk
Streets in Novosibirsk